Tynemouth is a constituency in Tyne and Wear represented in the House of Commons of the UK Parliament since 1997 by Sir Alan Campbell, a member of the Labour Party.

Creation
Tynemouth was one of 20 new single-member parliamentary boroughs created by the Reform Act 1832. However, under the Parliamentary Boundaries Act 1832, it is referred to as Tynemouth and North Shields. The constituency is referred to in various sources (e.g. Leigh Rayment and F.W.S.Craig) by the latter name between 1832 and 1885 and then treated as abolished and replaced by Tynemouth from 1885 onwards. However, there is no mention of this in the Redistribution of Seats Act 1885 and the boundaries were unchanged at that time. The current name of Tynemouth has officially been in use since the Representation of the People Act 1918. It therefore appears that both names were used for the same constituency at different times from 1832 to 1918.

Boundaries

1832-1918 

 Under the Parliamentary Boundaries Act 1832, the contents of Tynemouth and North Shields were defined as: The several Townships of Tynemouth, North Shields, Chirton, Preston and Cullercoats.

1918–1950 

 The County Borough of Tynemouth.

No change to the boundaries.

1950–1983 

 The County Borough of Tynemouth; and
 The Urban District of Whitley Bay.

Whitley Bay, which became a municipal borough in 1954, was transferred from the abolished constituency of Wansbeck.

1983–1997 

 The Borough of North Tyneside wards of Chirton, Collingwood, Cullercoats, Monkseaton, North Shields, Riverside, St Mary's, Seatonville, Tynemouth, Whitley Bay.

Minor changes to take account of changes to local authority and ward boundaries following the reorganisation under the Local Government Act 1972.

1997–2010 

 The Borough of North Tyneside wards of Chirton, Collingwood, Cullercoats, Monkseaton, North Shields, St Mary's, Seatonville, Tynemouth, Whitley Bay.

Riverside ward transferred to the new constituency of North Tyneside.

2010–present 

 The Borough of North Tyneside wards of Chirton, Collingwood, Cullercoats, Monkseaton North, Monkseaton South, Preston, St Mary's, Tynemouth, Valley, Whitley Bay.

Valley ward transferred from North Tyneside.

Constituency profile
Tynemouth is a coastal seat on the northern bank of the River Tyne. The seat covers Tynemouth, North Shields, Whitley Bay, Cullercoats, Monkseaton and, since 2010, Shiremoor and Backworth.

North Shields and the communities along the Tyne itself tend to be more industrial and working-class, once dominated by coal mining and shipbuilding. The coastal towns to the north, such as Whitley Bay, tend to be more middle-class dormitory towns for Newcastle commuters.

Workless claimants, registered jobseekers, were in November 2012 close to the national average of 3.8%, at 3.9% of the population based on a statistical compilation by The Guardian, lower than the regional average by 0.5%.

Political history
The seat has tended to be one of the more Conservative-leaning seats in the North East of England, where the party has traditionally struggled against the Labour Party. As a relatively middle-class area, it returned Conservative MPs from 1950 to 1997; albeit often on narrow majorities. It has been represented by Labour since 1997, though the Conservatives remain strong at a local level. Similar to Sefton Central on Merseyside, despite being a traditionally strong Conservative area in a Labour-dominated county, the area has swung significantly to Labour during the twenty-first century, and has been won by semi-marginal to safe margins by Labour candidates at every general election since 1997, with significant swings to Labour seen in both 2015 and 2017.

Since the 1997 general election, it has been represented by Alan Campbell of the Labour Party, who reached the level of government below a Minister of State in 2008, as a  Parliamentary Under-Secretary of State for the Home Office.

Members of Parliament

Constituency created (1885)

Elections

Elections in the 2010s

For the 2010 election, this was the primary target seat for the Conservatives in North East England following impressive local council victories since 2006 and the recent marginality of Alan Campbell's 2005 re-election.

Elections in the 2000s
Michael McIntyre was councillor for the Whitley Bay Ward at the time of polling. The Conservatives hoped to snatch the seat, but could only diminish Alan Campbell's majority. In the Mayoral election held on the same day, Mayor Linda Arkley (Conservative) narrowly lost re-election.

Labour MP Alan Campbell was returned in 2001 with a smaller majority during Tony Blair's second landslide.

Elections in the 1990s
In 1997 Labour won the seat for the first time since 1945. The Conservatives chose Gateshead Councillor Martin Callanan as their candidate to replace the retiring Neville Trotter. He would subsequently become a North East MEP and later a peer and government minister.

In 1992 Neville Trotter narrowly won his final term as the Labour candidate's fourth attempt failed. Many council seats were also unexpectedly won on the back of John Major's victory such as Whitley Bay and Monkseaton.

Elections in the 1980s

The 1983 election saw Neville Trotter's biggest majority after a landslide victory won by Margaret Thatcher.

Elections in the 1970s
1979: Patrick 'Paddy' Cosgrove's first of four attempts to win the seat. Cosgrove was the Labour councillor for Whitley Bay Ward.

February 1974: Neville Trotter, a Newcastle City Councillor and Chartered Accountant, became MP.

Jeremy Beecham would later become leader of Newcastle City Council and a Peer.

Elections in the 1960s

1966: Gordon Adam would latterly become a North East MEP and make a failed bid to become Mayor of North Tyneside in 2001.

Elections in the 1950s

Elections in the 1940s

Elections in the 1930s

Elections in the 1920s

Elections in the 1910s

1918: Dixon Scott was the founder of Newcastle's 'News Cinema', the modern 'Tyneside Cinema'.

Elections in the 1900s

Elections in the 1890s

Elections in the 1880s

See also
List of parliamentary constituencies in Tyne and Wear
History of parliamentary constituencies and boundaries in Tyne and Wear
History of parliamentary constituencies and boundaries in Northumberland

Notes

References

Constituencies of the Parliament of the United Kingdom established in 1885
Parliamentary constituencies in Tyne and Wear
Metropolitan Borough of North Tyneside